Toupah is a town in southern Ivory Coast. It is a sub-prefecture of Dabou Department in Grands-Ponts Region, Lagunes District.

Toupah was a commune until March 2012, when it became one of 1126 communes nationwide that were abolished.

In 2014, the population of the sub-prefecture of Toupah was 30,175.

Villages
The eleven villages of the sub-prefecture of Toupah and their population in 2014 are:

References

Sub-prefectures of Grands-Ponts
Former communes of Ivory Coast